Anton Hans Sarközi as Tony Wegas (born 3 May 1965 in Oberschützen) is an Austrian singer and television actor.

Biography

Wegas participated in "Ein Lied für Rom", the Austrian heat of the Eurovision Song Contest in 1991 with the song "Wunder dieser Welt". The song was placed second but Wegas was invited to represent Austria in 1992. He performed "Zusammen geh'n" in Malmö and despite being one of the favourites to win, could only manage tenth place. Austrian television decided to give him another chance in 1993 and he performed all of the songs in the national selection contest, "Veni Vidi Wegas". The winning song, "Maria Magdalena" came a disappointing fourteenth in Millstreet.

In 1993 he appeared in the Austrian set comedy series Hochwürden erbt das Paradies.

In the following years Tony had major problems with alcohol and other drugs. In 2000 he wrote a book about his addiction.

Discography

Singles
1990 – "Copa Cagrana" / "Conga Cagrana"
1992 – "Zusammen geh'n"

Studio albums
1994 – Feuerwerk
1995 – ...für Dich
2004 – The Very Best Of

External links

Austrian male television actors
20th-century Austrian male singers
Eurovision Song Contest entrants for Austria
Eurovision Song Contest entrants of 1992
Eurovision Song Contest entrants of 1993
1965 births
Living people
People from Oberwart District
Austrian Romani people